Leucostegane is a genus of plants in the family Fabaceae.

It contains the following species:
 Leucostegane grandis
 Leucostegane latistipulata

Detarioideae
Fabaceae genera
Taxonomy articles created by Polbot